Tom Rockmore (born 1942) is an American philosopher. Although he denies the usual distinction between philosophy and the history of philosophy, he has strong interests throughout the history of philosophy and defends a constructivist view of epistemology. The philosophers whom he has studied extensively are Kant, Fichte, Hegel, Marx, Lukács, and Heidegger. He received his Ph.D. from Vanderbilt University in 1974 and his Habilitation à diriger des recherches from the Université de Poitiers in 1994. He is Distinguished Professor Emeritus at Duquesne University, as well as Distinguished Humanities Chair Professor at Peking University.

Philosophy 
Rockmore is a strong critic of representationalism in epistemology. This is the view that the mind has access to external reality via copies of that reality that the mind receives from the object. It assumes a metaphysical realism, in which there is an external reality independent of the knower. Instead, Rockmore argues for a constructivist view on the basis of which the mind, on the basis of its experience, forms concepts and ideas that become the basis of its knowledge. This shift has significant consequences for phenomenology, aesthetics, and political philosophy. It further questions the transcendental claims particularly of early phenomenology.
 
As a historian of philosophy, Rockmore shows how German idealism influenced the development of both continental and analytic philosophy. He claims that Marx, in particular, was influenced by the thought of Kant, Schelling, Fichte, and Hegel. However, he argues that Marx's thought was significantly misunderstood by Engels. Engels' subsequent influence leads to the development of versions of Marxism that were inconsistent with much in Marx's original thinking.

Rockmore's political philosophy focuses on the effect of representational thinking on certain ideological strains that cause problematic political decisions in both Western and non Western states.

Rockmore has also published on aesthetics.

Selected bibliography 
Fichte, Marx, and the German Philosophical Tradition. Carbondale: Southern Illinois University Press, 1980. 
Hegel's Circular Epistemology.  Bloomington: Indiana University Press, 1986. 
Habermas on Historical Materialism. Bloomington: Indiana University Press, 1989. 
Irrationalism. Lukács  and the Marxist View of Reason. Philadelphia: Temple University Press, 1991. 
On Heidegger's Nazism and Philosophy. Berkeley: University of California Press, 1992. 
Before and After Hegel: A Historical Introduction to Hegel's Thought. Hackett Publishing, 1993. 
Heidegger and French Philosophy: Humanism, Antihumanism and Being. Routledge, 1995. 
On Hegel's Epistemology and Contemporary Philosophy. Humanity Books, 1996. 
Cognition: An Introduction to Hegel's Phenomenology of Spirit.  Berkeley: University of California Press, 1997. 
Marx After Marxism: The Philosophy of Karl Marx. London: Wiley Blackwell, 2002. 
On Foundationalism: A Strategy for Metaphysical Realism. Lanham: Rowman & Littlefield, 2004. 
On Constructivist Epistemology. Lanham: Rowman & Littlefield, 2005. 
Hegel, Idealism and Analytic Philosophy.  New Haven: Yale University Press, 2005. 
In Kant's Wake: Philosophy in the Twentieth Century.  London: Wiley Blackwell, 2006. 
Kant and Idealism. New Haven: Yale University Press, 2007. 
Kant and Phenomenology. Chicago: University of Chicago Press, 2011. 
Before and After 9/11: A Philosophical Examination of Globalization, Terror, and History. New York: Bloomsbury Academic, 2011. 
Art and Truth after Plato. Chicago: University of Chicago Press, 2013.  
German Idealism as Constructivism.  Chicago: University of Chicago Press, 2016. 
Marx's Dream: From Capitalism to Communism. Chicago: University of Chicago, 2018.

See also
 American philosophy
 List of American philosophers

References

External links
Tom Rockmore's webpage at Duquesne University (academic homepage)

American philosophers
Continental philosophers
Living people
1942 births
Heidegger scholars